This is a list of players who have won the title of Ohio Mr. Basketball.

There are two awards, one awarded by the Associated Press, and one awarded by the Ohio High School Basketball Coaches Association.

Award winners

Associated Press Mr. Basketball

Schools with multiple winners

Colleges with multiple winners

OHSBCA Mr. Basketball
The Ohio High School Basketball Coaches Association selects Mr. Basketball in Boys Basketball each year.  The procedures for the selection of Mr. Basketball is (1) that the Player must be nominated by a District Director or Officer, (2) Nominees can be a senior or underclassman, (3) Each player's stats will be discussed among the District Directors and Officers and (4) District Directors will vote to determine the winner.

Schools with multiple winners

Colleges with multiple winners

References 

Mr. and Miss Basketball awards
Awards established in 1988
Lists of people from Ohio
Mr. Basketball